Darwin Angeles Discua (born 22 October 1968) is a retired male boxer from Honduras, who competed in the men's light flyweight (– 48 kg) and flyweight (– 51 kg) division during his career. He twice competed for his native country at the Summer Olympics (1988 and 1996). Angeles carried the flag for Honduras at the opening ceremony of the 1996 Summer Olympics in Atlanta, Georgia. At the competition he was defeated in the first round of the men's flyweight competition by Ukraine's Serhiy Kovganko on points: 6-12.

References

External links
 sports-reference
 Darwin Angeles at Olympic.org

1968 births
Living people
Flyweight boxers
Boxers at the 1995 Pan American Games
Boxers at the 1988 Summer Olympics
Boxers at the 1996 Summer Olympics
Olympic boxers of Honduras
Pan American Games competitors for Honduras
Honduran male boxers